Minnesota State Highway 21 (MN 21) is a  highway in Minnesota, which runs from its intersection with State Highway 60 in Faribault and continues north to its northern terminus at its interchange with U.S. Highway 169 in Jordan, southwest of Shakopee.

Route description
State Highway 21 serves as a north–south route between Faribault, Montgomery, New Prague, and Jordan.

Highway 21 is also known as:

Broadway Street in Jordan
Helena Boulevard in Scott County
4th Avenue N.W. in New Prague
Lyndale Avenue in Faribault

The Lyndale Avenue portion in Faribault is built as a four-lane divided highway.

The southern terminus for Highway 21 is its intersection with State Highway 60 in Faribault.  Highway 21 becomes Rice County Road 48 upon crossing its intersection with Highway 60.

History
State Highway 21 was authorized in 1920, running from Zumbrota to St. Peter. In 1934, the segment east of Faribault became State Highway 60, and the segment west of Shieldsville became State Highway 99. Highway 21 was then extended northwest to Highway 13 at Montgomery, then north through New Prague to Jordan.

The southernmost section of Highway 21 through Faribault is second-generation old U.S. Highway 65 (constructed in the late 1950s), which was connected to a divided highway coming off Interstate Highway 35 in the 1960s.

Highway 21 was paved north of State Highway 19 by 1940.  The remainder of Highway 21 was paved in the late 1940s.

Major intersections

References 

021
Transportation in Rice County, Minnesota
Transportation in Le Sueur County, Minnesota
Transportation in Scott County, Minnesota